Codex 3227a of the   in Nuremberg  (also known as Hs. 3227a, GNM 3227a) is a manuscript of  169 folia, dated to the close of the 14th century. Its text is written in Latin and German. The German portions have been identified as in East Central German dialect.

The composition of the manuscript is sometimes dated to 1389 on the basis of the calendar  on fol. 83v which covers the years 1390–1495 (assuming that the scribe compiled the calendar for future reference only), but it has been noted that nothing precludes a date in the first quarter of the 15th century.

By the late 15th century, the manuscript was owned by Nicolaus Pol, who left the inscription . Pol is known as the personal surgeon to the emperors at Innsbruck from 1495. After Pol's death in 1532, his library, presumably including this manuscript, passed to Innichen Abbey in South Tyrol.

The manuscript is a pragmatic commonplace book apparently compiled for the scribe's personal use. It is an early example of such a compilation (if indeed it dates to before 1400), and is as such notable as a document of the transition from oral to written tradition during the late medieval period.

The compilation contains notes on an eclectic variety of topics, including alchemy, magical formulas, conjuring tricks, chemical recipes for fireworks, paints, medicine, ironworking, etc.

A substantial portion of the manuscript is a combat manual, making it of particular notability for the study of Historical European Martial Arts. It is the earliest record of the German school of fencing in the tradition of Johannes Liechtenauer. Liechtenauer is here for the first time mentioned by name, and his teachings quoted. His tradition of martial arts, especially the fencing with the longsword would remain influential in Germany throughout the 15th and for much of the 16th century.

The manuscript text had never been edited in print prior to its notability to the Historical European Martial Arts revival. The study of relevant combat treatises was guided by the seminal dissertation by Hils (1985), and  the first full transcriptions were published online.

Hils (1985, p. 106) identified Hanko Döbringer as the author of the manuscript,  a mistake inherited from the earlier survey by Wierschin (1965). It was inspired by the fact that the name is written on the page margin on fol. 43r. When the manuscript text was edited, it became clear that Döbringer's name was added in the margin because it had been omitted by accident from a list of four "other masters" discussed on that page. This mistake has resulted in the manuscript being also known as "Codex Döbringer" (so Ehlert and Leng 2003) or similar.

Contents:
1r - 5v  treatise on fireworks
5v magic formulas in Latin and German
6r  recipes for powders used for painting
6v - 10v Latin recipes (paint, alchemy, medicine)
11r - 12r German instructions for the strengthening of iron
12v - 13r alchemical recipes in Latin
13v - 17v treatise on sword fencing, on foot, on horseback, unarmoured or armoured
18r - 40r teachings of Johannes Liechtenauer on unarmoured foot combat.
43r - 45v teachings of other masters, in verse (Hanko Döbringer, Andres Juden, Jost von der Neißen, Nidas Preußen).
47r - 48v glosses on technical terms of the preceding section
52v on sportive (non-serious) fencing 
53r - 60v teachings of Liechtenauer on combat on horseback and armoured combat with spear and sword.
62r  fragment on wrestling
64r - 65r recapitulation of the teachings of Liechtenauer
66v - 73v astrological texts, magical and medicinal recipes, onomatomancy
74r fragment on combat with sword and shield
74v - 77v recipes for paint, tumors, metal and ivory treatment
78r fragment on combat with the long-staff
79r - 81v miscellaneous Latin recipes, treatment of gems, preparation of a miraculous potion
82 on combat with the long knife
83v Latin calendar, 1390–1495
84r - 85r on combat with the dagger
85 magical recipes
86r - 89r Liechtenauer on wrestling, interspersed with additional recipes
90v - 165v recipes for dental hygiene, various alchemical recipes, food recipes, nonsense recipes, in various hands
166r - 169v index to the recipes in the manuscript, partly illegible

References

Martin Wierschin, Meister Johann Liechtenauers Kunst des Fechtens (1965), pp. 31–34.
H. P. Hils, Meister Johann Liechtenauers Kunst des langen Schwertes (1985), pp. 104–110 (no. 41).
Trude Ehlert,  Rainer Leng, 'Frühe Koch- und Pulverrezepte aus der Nürnberger Handschrift GNM 3227a (um 1389)'; in: Medizin in Geschichte, Philologie und Ethnologie (2003).

External links
 Grzegorz Żabiński (2001)
 David Lindholm (2005)
 Dierk Hagedorn (2008)

14th-century manuscripts
Combat treatises
Alchemical documents
1380s books
Collections of the Germanisches Nationalmuseum